Loxioda is a genus of moths of the family Erebidae. The genus was described by Warren in 1913.

Species
Loxioda alternans Hampson, 1926
Loxioda coniventris Strand, 1915
Loxioda dilutalis Snellen, 1884
Loxioda dissimilis Moore, 1882
Loxioda ectherma Hampson, 1926
Loxioda fasciosa Moore, 1882
Loxioda hampsoni Bethune-Baker, 1906
Loxioda inamoena Filipjev, 1925
Loxioda ochrota Hampson, 1909
Loxioda oxyperas Hampson, 1926
Loxioda shumara Swinhoe, 1901
Loxioda similis Moore, 1882

References

Calpinae